Micromyrtus obovata is a plant species of the family Myrtaceae endemic to Western Australia.

It blooms between July and September, producing white flowers.

It is found on hills, slopes and flats in the Wheatbelt region of Western Australia where it grows in clay-sandy to sandy soils.

References

obovata
Flora of Western Australia
Plants described in 1985